Vilst er síðsta fet (Lost is the last step) is the debut EP by the Faroese doom metal band Hamferð. It was released on December 14, 2010 via Tutl Records.

Track listing

 "Harra Guð títt dýra navn og æra" (God the Lord, Thy Precious Name and Honour) – 4:45 
 "Vráin" (The Alcove) – 8:25
 "Aldan revsar eitt vargahjarta" (The Wave Smites a Wolf's Heart) – 8:37
 "At enda" (To an End) – 8:57

Personnel
Hamferð
 Jón Aldará - Vocals
 John Áki Egholm – Guitars
 Theodor Kapnas – Guitars
 Esmar Joensen – Keyboards
 Tinna Tótudóttir - Bass
 Remi Kofoed Johannesen - Drums

Additional musicians and production
 Astrid Lindh - Percussion on the intro of Harra Guð títt dýra navn og æra
 Björn Guo - Violin on At enda
 Karl Appelgren - Grand piano on At enda
 Mastering - Peter In de Betou
 Reamping of distorted guitars - Greg Tomao

2010 albums
Hamferð albums